Peter B. Bennett (12 June 1931 – 9 August 2022) was the founder and a president and CEO of the Divers Alert Network (DAN), a non-profit organization devoted to assisting scuba divers in need. He was a professor of anesthesiology at Duke University Medical Center, and was the Senior Director of the Center for Hyperbaric Medicine and Environmental Physiology at Duke. Bennett is recognized as a leading authority on the effects of high pressure on human physiology.

Bennett was born in Portsmouth, Hampshire, England. He was employed at the Royal Navy Physiology Laboratory near Portsmouth for 20 years, beginning in 1953. During this time, he formed and headed the Defence and Civil Institute for Environmental Medicine in Canada.

Education
 University of London, 1951, B.Sc.
 University of Southampton, 1964, Ph.D.
 University of Southampton, 1984, D.Sc.

Research
As a researcher, Bennett performed studies of nitrogen narcosis, oxygen toxicity, submarine escape, decompression illness, ascent rates, and the effects of flying after diving. Bennett was a consultant on the James Cameron underwater science fiction film The Abyss, in which a character experiences HPNS.

Bennett is credited with the invention of trimix breathing gas. In 45 years, Bennett published over 200 scientific papers and six books.

Retirement
Dr. Bennett received the 2002 Diving Equipment and Marketing Association (DEMA) Reaching Out Award for his contribution to the diving industry, and the Ernst and Young Entrepreneur of the Year 2002 award for contributions to business in the life sciences. He stepped down as President of the Divers Alert Network of America on 30 June 2003, after 23 years at the helm. Bennett was pressured by board members to step down, in reaction to alleged improprieties in his handling of the organization's finances.

From 2004 to 2007, Bennett served as Executive Director of the International Divers Alert Network.

From 2007 to 2014, Bennett served as the executive director of the Undersea and Hyperbaric Medical Society.

See also
 Divers Alert Network
 Undersea and Hyperbaric Medical Society

References

External links
 Background at Duke University Medical Center
  UHMS and DAN Publications

1931 births
2022 deaths
20th-century English medical doctors
British medical researchers
English chief executives
People from Portsmouth
Alumni of the University of London
Alumni of the University of Southampton
Duke University faculty
Foreign Members of the Russian Academy of Sciences
Science of underwater diving